The 2018 Uber Cup qualification process is a series of tournaments organised by the five BWF confederations to decide 14 of the 16 teams which will play in the 2018 Uber Cup, with Thailand qualifying automatically as hosts, and China qualifying automatically as trophy holder.

Qualified teams

Qualification process
The number of teams participating in the final tournament are 16. Even though the qualification process began in February 2018, the allocation of slots for each confederation was similar to the allocation in 2016 tournament.

Summary of qualification

Note
Badminton Asia total includes +1 for Thailand as hosts, and China as trophy holders.
Various is the top three of the ranking qualification.

Confederation qualification

Badminton Confederation of Africa

The qualification for the African teams was held from 12 to 15 February 2018, at the Hacène Harcha Arena in Algiers, Algeria. The winners of the African qualification will qualified for the Uber Cup.

Teams in contention
Teams qualified for the Group stage

First round (group stage)

Second round (knockout stage)

Badminton Asia

The qualification for the Asian teams was held from 6 to 11 February 2018, at the Stadium Sultan Abdul Halim in Alor Setar, Malaysia. The semi-finalist of the Asian qualification will qualified for the Uber Cup. Thailand qualifying automatically as hosts, and China qualifying automatically as trophy holder.

Teams in contention
Teams qualified for the Group stage

 (qualified)
 

 
 
 

 (qualified)

First round (group stage)

Second round (knockout stage)

Badminton Europe

The qualification for the European teams was held from 13 to 18 February 2018, at the Kazan Gymnastics Centre in Kazan, Russia. The semi-finalist of the European qualification will qualified for the Uber Cup.

Teams in contention
Teams qualified for the Group stage

First round (group stage)

Ranking of runners-up

Second round (knockout stage)

Badminton Pan Am

The qualification for the Pan American teams will held from 15 to 18 February 2018, at the National Racket Centre in Tacarigua, Trinidad and Tobago. The winner of the Pan American qualification will qualified for the Uber Cup.

Teams in contention
Teams qualified for the Group stage

First round (group stage)

Second round (knockout stage)

Badminton Oceania

The qualification for the Oceanian teams was held from 6 to 7 February 2018, at the Eastlink Badminton Stadium in Hamilton, New Zealand. The winner of the Oceania qualification will qualified for the Uber Cup.

Teams in contention

Round-robin

World team rankings 
Below is the chart of the BWF World Team Ranking calculated by adding World Ranking of top three Women's Singles players and top two Women's Doubles pairs on 22 February 2018.

References

qualification